Longlin Various Nationalities (Gezu) Autonomous County is an autonomous county, under the jurisdiction of the prefecture-level city of Baise, in the west of Guangxi, China, bordering Guizhou Province to the north. As of 2019, the county's population was 437,907 people.

The county is inhabited by several ethnic minorities, including the Miao, Yi, Gelao and Zhuang, who constitute approximately 80% of the county's population.

History 
Xilong Prefecture underwent administrative changes in 1729, but otherwise went unchanged until 1912, when the Republic of China was established and the area was reorganized as Xilong County.

The area became part of the People's Republic of China in March 1950, and a communist-led local government was set up on March 18, 1950. On January 1, 1953 the area was renamed from Xilong County to Longlin County.

Geography 
Longlin is bordered by Tianlin County to the east, Xilin County to the south, and by Anlong County and Ceheng County in Guizhou Province to the north. The county is home to the Tianshengqiao I and Tianshengqiao II dams, which sit along the Nanpan River.

Climate

Administrative divisions 
Longlin County is divided into 6 towns and 10 townships.

Demographics

Vital Statistics 
As of 2010, the county had a crude birth rate of 20.04 per 1,000, and a crude death rate of 5.37 per 1,000, giving the county a rate of natural increase of 14.67 per 1,000.

Ethnic groups

Zhuang People 

Miao People 
The county is home to six different groups of Miao people:

 Lopsided Miao, whose autonyms are Meng Sha and Meng Xia
 Red Head Miao, whose autonyms are Meng Lin, Meng Lun, Meng Ling, or Shou Lun
 Clear Water Miao, whose autonym is Meng Pu
 White Miao, whose autonym is Meng Lou
 Flower Miao, whose autonym is Meng Zou
 Vegetable Miao, also known in Chinese as the Ginger Planing Miao, the Zai River Miao, and the Zai Village Miao, and whose autonyms are Meng Jia Ka and Meng Bai

Despite these different groups within the Miao populations of Longlin, all groups share similar ethnic origins. The Miao People of Longlin County are believed to be native to Hubei and Hunan who migrated southwest towards Guizhou and Yunnan, and later arrived in the region during the late Ming Dynasty and early Qing Dynasty. The probably reason for this migration appears connected to the Qing suppression of Miao uprisings in Guizhou and Xiangxi. The Miao People of Longlin County have many cultural similarities to Miao populations found in Guizhou, including shared folklore, linguistic dialects, naming conventions, toponymy, rituals, and celebrations.

The former townships of Kechang, Changfa, and Changme also have considerable Miao populations.

Yi People 
Longlin is home to a considerable amount of Yi, who historically lived in western Yunnan. Historical documents from the Nanzhao State suggest that certain Yi populations left Yunnan to avoid inter-tribal violence. Within De'e, Yi people are concentrated in Agao, Nadi, Nongbao, Tangshi, and 10 other villages.

Gelao People 
The county's Gelao People moved to the area from Guizhou during the early Qing Dynasty, with local legends suggesting that the reason for this migration could have been conflict or famine.

In May 1990, a group of people known as the Lai, who moved to the area from Guizhou during the early Ming Dynasty, were determined to be part of the Gelao people by the county government after a five day hearing on the matter. When the change was made in 1990, 978 people who were formerly classified as Lai in ethnicity were re-designated Gelao in ethnicity.

The villages of Sanchong and Moji have particularly large Gelao populations.

Han Chinese 
The first migration of Han Chinese to the area took place shortly after the Song Dynasty, and a document from 1673 suggests more than 10 Han families lived in area at the time.

Unrecognized groups 
The autonomous county is home to some Bolyu people, an unrecognized ethnic minority. The Bolyu mostly live in the northern portion of the autonomous county, alongside local Miao populations.

Economy 
As of 2019, the county's primary sector accounts for 26.1% of the economy, the secondary sector accounts for 19.5%, and the tertiary sector accounts for 54.4%.

As of 2019, the disposable income of the county's urban residents averages 32,508 Yuan, and the disposable income of the county's rural residents averages 9,972 Yuan.

Culture 
Each year, at the beginning of the lunar new year, a festival in the village of De'e is held, featuring the music and dance of the various ethnic groups who live in the area. Each ethnic group also has its own traditions to celebrate the lunar new year, some of which are shared across multiple different groups.

The county's different peoples also have festivals unique to their own ethnicity, as well as festivals shared across multiple different ethnicities, such as the Dragon Boat Festival and the Double Third Festival.

Transportation 
National Highway 324 runs through the county.

See also
De'e

References

External links
Longlin page (Chinese)
Longlin page (Chinese)
Longlin page (Chinese)
Textile photos taken in Longlin

 
Counties and cities in Baise
Gelao autonomous counties
Yi autonomous counties
Miao autonomous counties